Xinjian is a town in Fenggang County, Guizhou province, China. , it has one residential community and 3 villages under its administration.

See also 
 List of township-level divisions of Guizhou

References 

Township-level divisions of Guizhou
Fenggang County